Rebellions in the Habsburg monarchy

Anti-Habsburg rebellion (1546–47)
Anti-Habsburg rebellion (1604–06), in Kingdom of Hungary, led by Stephen Bocskai
Bohemian rebellion (1618–20), Bohemia
Vlach uprisings in Moravia (1618–44), in Moravia.
Uskok rebellion (1621), in the Military Frontier
Križevci rebellion (1631), in the Military Frontier
Varaždin rebellion (1632), broke out in the Varaždin generalate (Slavonian Military Frontier) when the frontiersmen rose up against local Austrian governors. The rebellion was suppressed, and knez (count) Marko Bogdanović and harambaša Smiljan Vujica (or Smoljan Vujić) were executed. 
Varaždin rebellion (1665–66), broke out in the Varaždin generalate when frontiersmen under Stefan Osmokruhović rose up against the Austrian officers, after the rights of the frontiersmen had been compromised. 
Anti-Habsburg rebellion (1678–82), led by Imre Thököly
Rákóczi's War of Independence (1703–11)
Bavarian People's Uprising (1705–06)
Karlovac rebellion (1746), in the Military Frontier
Uskok rebellion (1754), in the Military Frontier
Varaždin rebellion (1755), also known as Severin Uprising, led by Petar Ljubojević, in the Military Frontier
Denisko uprising (1797), Polish rebellion in Galicia, led by Joachim Denisko

See also
List of revolutions and rebellions

References

Habsburg Monarchy
Habsburg Monarchy
Habsburg Monarchy
Austria history-related lists
Military history of the Habsburg monarchy